Galand Rud (also Romanized as Galand Rūd; also known as Galanrūd) is a village in Mian Band Rural District, in the Central District of Nur County, Mazandaran Province, Iran. At the 2006 census, its population was 57, in 18 families.

References 

Populated places in Nur County